Hormah (meaning "broken rock", "banned", or "devoted to destruction"), also known by its Canaanite name Zephath (Tsfat צפת), is an unidentified city mentioned in the Hebrew Bible in relation to several conflicts between the migrant Israelite people seeking to enter the Promised Land and the Amalekites and the Canaanites who dwelt at that time in southern Canaan.

Biblical reference
The city is mentioned in Book of Numbers 14:45 as the site of an Israelite defeat:
Then the Amalekites and the Canaanites who dwelt in that mountain came down and attacked them, and drove them back as far as Hormah.

The city is then mentioned in Book of Numbers 21:2-3 as the site of an Israelite victory:
Then Israel made this vow to the LORD: "If you will deliver these people into our hands, we will totally destroy their cities." The LORD listened to Israel's plea and gave the Canaanites over to them. They completely destroyed them and their towns; so the place was named Hormah.

Hormah is also mentioned in Book of Judges 1:17: 
Then the men of Judah went with the Simeonites their brothers and attacked the Canaanites living in Zephath, and they totally destroyed the city. Therefore, it was called Hormah.

Identification
Its location is unknown; some place it between Beer Sheba and Gaza, some between Beer Sheba and Arad, and some east of the Arabah Valley in the ruins of Sarta, on the western slopes below biblical Tophel (today's town of Tafileh).

For the Beersheva–Arad Valley location, several options have been suggested, from west to east: Tel Sera (fr), Tel Masos (fr), Tel Ira (fr), Tel Malhata (fr) (all with articles in French Wikipedia, some also in Hebrew).

Anson Rainey offers a thorough discussion of the options and references to supporting studies on p. 122 of his book, The Sacred Bridge.

See also
Cities in the Book of Joshua

External links
Bible Study
The Columbia Encyclopedia, Sixth Edition
WebBible Encyclopedia

References

Hebrew Bible cities
Massacres in the Bible